Chobokwane is a village in Ghanzi District of Botswana. It is located south-west of the district capital Ghanzi, and has a primary school. The population was 771 in 2011 census.

References

Ghanzi District
Villages in Botswana